Over time, many hotels in New York City have been demolished. This list tries to gather them.

The List

Planned buildings 
 New York’s Hotel Commonwealth (1918)
 New Murray Hill Hotel
 New Hotel Manhattan

References

Links 
 Old New York in Postcards #2 – Old Hotels of New York City

Related pages 
 List of demolished buildings and structures in New York City

Lists of buildings and structures in New York City